Nadaw (also spelt Natdaw) is the ninth month of the traditional Burmese calendar.

Festivals and observances
Mahagiri Nat Festival, Mount Popa
Literature and Arts Festival
Pagoda festivals
Botahtaung Pagoda Festival (Yangon)

Nadaw symbols
Flower: Bulbophyllum auricomum

References

See also
Burmese calendar
Festivals of Burma

Burmese culture
Months of the Burmese calendar